Don Emilio Pucci, Marchese di Barsento (20 November 1914 – 29 November 1992) was an Italian aristocrat, fashion designer and politician. He and his eponymous company are synonymous with geometric prints in a kaleidoscope of colors.

Early life
Pucci was born in Naples in 1914 to one of Florence's oldest noble families, and he lived and worked in the Pucci Palace in Florence for much of his life. He was a keen sportsman who swam, skied, fenced, played tennis and raced cars.

At the age of 17, Pucci traveled to Lake Placid, New York, as part of the Italian team at the 1932 Winter Olympics, but he did not compete. After two years at the University of Milan, he studied agriculture at the University of Georgia in Athens, Georgia, where he became a member of the Demosthenian Literary Society. In 1935, he was given a full scholarship to Reed College in Oregon in return for developing a college ski team. He earned an MA in social science from Reed College in 1937, and was awarded his doctorate (laurea) in political science from the University of Florence the same year.

World War II
In 1938, Pucci joined the Italian Air Force, and served as an SM.79 torpedo bomber pilot during World War II, rising to the rank of captain  and receiving decorations for valour. During the war he became a confidant  of Benito Mussolini's eldest daughter, Edda, and played a key role in a plan to save the life of her husband, Mussolini's former Foreign Minister, Count Galeazzo Ciano, who was on trial for his part in the removal of Mussolini from power in 1943. The plan involved delivering some of Ciano's papers (which were highly critical of Mussolini) to the Gestapo so that they could be bartered for Ciano's life.

After Adolf Hitler vetoed the scheme, Pucci drove Edda to the Swiss border on 9 January 1944 and ensured her escape. Before departing, Edda wrote last pleas to Hitler, Mussolini, and General Wilhelm Harster, the SD commander in Italy, and Pucci delivered these letters to an intermediary. He then attempted to flee to Switzerland himself, but he was arrested and transported to San Vittore prison in Milan, where he was tortured by the Gestapo in a futile attempt to extract information. Pucci then managed to escape and reach Switzerland, where he remained until the end of the war.

Fashion career

The first clothes designed by Pucci were for the Reed College skiing team. His designs came to wider attention in 1947, when he was on leave in Zermatt, Switzerland. Skiwear that he had designed for a female friend was photographed by Toni Frissell, a photographer working for Harper's Bazaar. Frissell's editor asked Pucci to design skiwear for a story on European Winter Fashion, which ran in the winter 1948 issue of the Bazaar.

Pucci was the first person to design a one-piece ski suit. Although there had been some experiments with stretch fabrics in Europe before the war, Pucci's sleek designs caused a sensation, and he received several offers from American manufacturers to produce them. Instead, he left the Air Force and set up an haute couture house in the fashionable resort of Canzone del Mare on the Isle of Capri.

Initially, he used his knowledge of stretch fabrics to produce a swimwear line in 1949, but he soon moved onto other items such as brightly coloured, boldly patterned silk scarves. Stanley Marcus of Neiman Marcus encouraged him to use the designs in blouses and then a popular line of wrinkle-free printed silk dresses. Pucci presented his collection in the first fashion shows in Italy in 1950. Pucci added a boutique in Rome as business thrived, helped by Capri's role as a destination for the international jet set. By the early 1950s, Pucci was achieving international recognition, receiving the Neiman-Marcus Award in Dallas and the Burdine's Sunshine Award in Miami.

By the 1960s, Pucci was further thrust into greater status when Marilyn Monroe became a fan. She was photographed by George Barris in a number of Pucci's items in what would be some of her final photographs. After Monroe's death in 1962, she was interred wearing a Pucci dress.

As the decade progressed his designs were worn by everyone from actess Sophia Loren to author Jacqueline Susann to First Lady Jackie Kennedy, as well as later pop icons such as Madonna during an early 1990s period of 60s revival. Whenever the Sixties were revived in fashion, Pucci was likely to be referenced. In fashion history, especially during the period of the 1950s and 1960s, Pucci was a perfect transition example between luxurious couture and ready-to-wear in Europe and the North America.

In 1959, Pucci decided to create a lingerie line. His atelier in Rome advised him to develop the line abroad, avoiding the difficulties of a decade earlier in matching available fabrics to the patterns of his first swimwear line. As a result, Pucci came to Chicago giving the lingerie contract to Formfit-Rogers mills. The venture proved to be successful, and Pucci was made vice president in charge of design and merchandising for the company a year later.

In February 1959, he married Cristina Nannini from Rome, about whom he later remarked, "I married a Botticelli." They had two children, Alessandro and Laudomia. Alessandro died in a car crash in 1998, six years after his father.

Braniff Airways, NASA, and Lincoln
In 1965, New York ad agency Jack Tinker and Associates was hired by Braniff International Airways to update their image. The agency's Mary Wells hired Alexander Girard to remodel the terminals, and Pucci to design new clothes for the hostesses. As the ads put it, it was "The End of the Plain Plane".

Pucci would end up designing six complete collections for Braniff hostesses, pilots and ground crew between 1965 and 1974. A mark of his impact was that by 1968 Barbie had versions of all of his first four uniforms. These avant-garde creations were designed as individual components to be added or removed as weather dictated. The uniforms included turtlenecks, T-shirts, crop jackets, and culottes. Among the more unusual innovations was a "bubble helmet" – a clear plastic hood worn by flight attendants between terminal building and aircraft to protect their hairdos from rain and the blast of jet engines. There were two designs of the "bubble helmet" that was dubbed RainDome by Braniff and Bola and Space Helmet by Emilio Pucci.  The first edition, called a Bola, was a zippered version that ran down the center of the helmet and the second was a snap together version in place of the zipper called Space Helmet. Pucci incorporated Girard's "BI" logo into some of his prints.

Pucci's influence extended to the Moon. He suggested the three bird motif for the design of the Apollo 15 mission patch, although the crew replaced his blues and greens with a more patriotic red, white, and blue, according to Apollo astronaut and retired U.S. Air Force Colonel Al Worden at a presentation, "Apollo 11: Behind the Scene", at the Whalehead Club in Corolla, North Carolina, 18 July 2019.

From 1976 to 1983, Pucci chose exterior and interior colors and trim for a special Pucci Edition of the Lincoln Mark series of automobiles for the luxury Lincoln division of Ford Motor Company in the United States: a Mark IV in 1976, a Mark V from 1977 to 1979, and a Mark VI from 1980 to 1983, the details of the design changing slightly each year.

Political career
In addition to his work in fashion, Pucci contested the Florence–Pistoia district for the Italian Liberal Party in the Italian election of April 1963. He came second on their slate with 2,780 votes behind Vittorio Fossombroni, but the party only won one seat. However he succeeded Fossombroni in the Italian Chamber of Deputies in August of that year.

He retained his seat in the 1968 election, but lost it in the 1972 election, despite being the district's top PLI candidate with 4,231 votes.

Pucci label

After Emilio Pucci's death in 1992, his daughter, Laudomia Pucci, continued to design under the Pucci name. The French LVMH luxury goods empire acquired 67% of Pucci in 2000. Laudomia became Image Director, while LVMH brought in major designers such as Christian Lacroix (creative director 2002-05), and in October 2005, Matthew Williamson, and Peter Dundas from 2009. Other designers who have worked for the label include Stephan Janson and Julio Espada.

The items mostly feature the designer's original brightly coloured, often swirly, prints or new designs in his original distinct style. The fashion house produces ready-to-wear clothes and accessories for women, in addition to a small range of men's accessories. In the past, the house has produced a more comprehensive range of men's wear, including a line in partnership with Ermenegildo Zegna, which included men's jackets lined with Pucci printed fabric, especially for American department store Saks Fifth Avenue. A limited-edition Pucci carrying case for the PlayStation Portable handheld gaming system was marketed by Sony as a high-end accessory on their PlayStation Signature line.

Pucci boutiques in the U.S., all designed by the Brazilian , are located in New York City, Las Vegas, Bal Harbour, Palm Beach, Beverly Hills, Boston, South Coast Plaza, East Hampton, New York, Miami and coming soon to Dallas. The newest of the stores just opened at 855 Monroe Ave. in New York City.

Clients include Crown Princess Mette-Marit of Norway, singer Kylie Minogue and presenter Alexa Chung.

Pucci also designed the costumes for Rita Ora's Radioactive Tour. In March 2014, Alessandra Carra stepped down as CEO of Pucci. In March 2015, Massino Giorgetti was named creative director, replacing Peter Dundas. Then from 2017 to 2021, Pucci operated without a creative director, relying on a team of designers. Since June 2021, LVMH owns 100% of Pucci. Laudomia Pucci remained in charge of the house's archives and heritage. In September 2021, Camille Miceli became creative director of Pucci. In July 2022, Saar Debrouwere took over as CEO of the fashion house.

References

External links
 
 Pucci since 1948 Photos of Pucci designs through time, including Poppi de Salis wearing one of the original skirts
 Pucci 2000–2007 Photos of some recent Pucci designs

Fashion designers from Florence
Clothing companies of Italy
High fashion brands
Italian brands
LVMH brands
Emilio
1914 births
1992 deaths
Politicians from Florence
Companies based in Tuscany
Clothing companies established in 1947
Design companies established in 1947
Italian companies established in 1947
Italian World War II pilots
Italian fashion designers
Regia Aeronautica personnel of World War II
Reed College alumni